Margalo may refer to:

 Margalo Gillmore (1897–1986), American actress
 Margalo, a fictional canary in the novel Stuart Little and in the movie Stuart Little 2